Ana Paula Andrade Matos Moreira is the current Vice Mayor of Salvador since 2021. She is the running-mate of Ciro Gomes in the 2022 Brazilian presidential election.

Biography
Ana Paula Matos was born in Salvador. She was educated at Salvador University, Catholic University of Salvador, and Federal University of Bahia and holds a BBA, MBA, and LL. B. She joined PDT in 2020.

She began her career in municipal government as the Director General of Education in 2013. She was also secretary of the Neighbourhood Prefectures and secretary of Social Promotion, Sports, and Combating Poverty.

She was an employee of Petrobras. She ran a ticket with Bruno Reis for Mayor and Vice Mayor of Salvador. The ticket was victorious, and she became Vice Mayor of Salvador.

In the 2022 Brazilian presidential election, she is the running mate of Ciro Gomes.

References

|-

Living people
Democratic Labour Party (Brazil) politicians
People from Salvador, Bahia
Federal University of Bahia alumni
Candidates for Vice President of Brazil
21st-century Brazilian women politicians
Date of birth missing (living people)
Year of birth missing (living people)